The 2002 St. George Illawarra Dragons season was the fourth in the joint venture club's history. The Dragons competed in the NRL's 2002 premiership season. The team finished seventh in the regular season, making finals but getting knocked out in the second week against the Cronulla-Sutherland Sharks, losing 40–24.

Squad gains and losses

Ladder

Ladder progression

Season results

References 

St. George Illawarra Dragons
St. George Illawarra Dragons seasons
2002 in rugby league by club